Caversham Lakes is a set of lakes created through gravel extraction between the suburb of Caversham in Reading, Berkshire and the hamlet of Sonning Eye in Oxfordshire, just north of the River Thames and also refers to the sports buildings and facilities alongside those lakes.

Overview 
The lakes are formed from former gravel pits in the floodplain of the River Thames. The company Lafarge and formerly Redland plc have undertaken the gravel extraction though the Sonning Works. Caversham Lakes Trust Ltd has been set up to administer the lakes.

Sport and leisure

Watersports 
A wide range of activities from open water swimming, stand up paddle boarding, kayaking, canoeing & aqua park are available from and run by Caversham Lakes, the Thames Valleys premier watersports venue.

Open Water Swimming 
Open water swimming sessions are available from the main lake organised by Caversham Lakes. Suitable for all ages and abilities with three swim courses marked out across the lake from 400m, 750m & 1500m.

Rowing
In 2006, the Redgrave Pinsent Rowing Lake was added to the lakes in the park.  The GB Rowing team use this lake as a main base at which to train.  Team GB also carry out land-based training at Bisham Abbey and occasionally close to Nottingham at Holme Pierrepont National Watersports Centre.

Sonning Regatta has been held every two years since 2000 – usually on the Thames adjoining, alternatively, in bad weather, on the Redgrave Pinsent Rowing Lake.

Motorboating
The Thames and Kennet Marina in motorboating also uses an engineered lake (a marina dock) with access to the river Thames.

Sailing
The main venue in mid-Berkshire and south Oxfordshire for sailing is at Reading Sailing Club.

Waterskiing
A wide variety of waterskiing courses with fixed jumps is available and used by the Isis Waterski Club. Princess Margaret and her husband Lord Snowdon waterskied here during the 1960s.

Angling
Fishing is available at no charge on the public stretches of the Thames adjoining, having obtained the relevant annual government licences.  It is also available on a paid basis at a few of the lakes which are accordingly replenished with a wide variety of fish.

References 

Lakes of Oxfordshire
Sonning
LCaversham
Artificial lakes